Mandu may refer to:

Geographic toponyms 
 Mandu River, a river in Minas Gerais, Brazil
 Mandu, Democratic Republic of the Congo, a village
 Mandu, Madhya Pradesh, a ruined city in Dhar district, Madhya Pradesh, India
 Mandu, Jharkhand, a township in Ramgarh district, Jharkhand, India
 Mandu Assembly constituency, assembly constituency in Jharkhand, India
 Mandu (community development block), Jharkhand, India

Other uses
 Mandu (food), a type of filled dumpling in Korean cuisine
 Mandu, a mutated pig adopted by Kipo in the DreamWorks animated series Kipo and the Age of Wonderbeasts.

See also
 Mándu, Australian rock singer from the 1970s